Barazai is a village situated in the east of Hazro Tehsil, Attock District in northern Punjab in Pakistan. Its altitude is 315 metres (1036 feet).

Demographics
The population of Barazai is at least half Pakhtun, with the remainder being Pakhtunized Hindkowan.  Barazai village is located in Chhachh, in the east of Hazro Tehsil and the northern part of Attock District in Punjab province of Pakistan, close to the border of Khyber Pakhtunkhwa (North-West Frontier) Province. Barazai is the biggest village of Union Council Malak Mala with a population of nearly 16,000.  The founder of this village was Barza Khan, a Musazai chieftain from Kabul who settled in the area during the Ghaznavid conquests. He had seven sons of whom three died, two as infants and one in his adolescent years, he was not married and had no offspring. The names of Barza Khan's sons were as follows: Qasim Khan, Maghdoz Khan, Mirza Khan, Shabaz Khan, and Kooden Khan. The four mohallahs are named after the four sons who lived on to get married and have children. His descendants, called Maliks still live in the village and abroad, however many of them have intermingled and married into the village’s other populations.

A plurality of the population of Barazai has Pakhtun roots and follow the Pashtunwali code, called Pathan Walgi in the local dialect. They are mostly Musazai, a Sarkani Alakozai tribe, and Alizai, with a handful of people from other tribes, such as Swatis and Kochian. Newer immigrant Pashtuns in this village are referred to as Kabulis, regardless of whether they actually are from Afghanistan. The residents of this village primarily speak Hindko, though many elders throughout the village can still speak a northern dialect of Pakhto. The highest proportion of Pakhto speakers reside in Mohallah Shaba Khel, where the younger generations can still understand and speak it, though it is on the way out due to a lack of utility.  Many tribes came from other parts of the country to cater and seek employment amongst the Pathans, who later settled and are now recognized as villagers. These tribes make up the rest of the population living in the village. 

People from Barazai have migrated to many countries around the world with the majority migrating to the United Kingdom, who reside in the city of Bradford, West Yorkshire, England. Others have become immigrants of United States, Malaysia and Hong Kong. Many work abroad in Middle East countries such as the United Arab Emirates and Saudi Arabia.

Most residents of this village work in agriculture, small shops, or government.

Infrastructure
Barazai has both girls and boys primary and secondary public schools. With recent development, external organizations have established private primary schools with the aim to improve the education standards the village purveys. These private institutions offer a higher standard of education, which has attracted applications and students from neighboring villages. There is one Sufi ziyarat for Almahroof Baba Ji Sahib who belongs to Barazai. Also, there are other ziyarats such as Shaheed Baba, Mian Kamal Baba, and Mullah Baba. Originally, Barazai had four mohallahs - Maghdoobzai, Qasim Khel, Shaba Khel, and Mullah Khel. Newer mohallahs include Musa Khel, Mashriqi Dhowk, Maghrabi Dhowk, Nawababad, School Banda, Fatehabad,  and others. Malik Barza Khan lived in Mullah Khel and is believed by the village Maliks to be buried in the Pachokar Kabrah, which is the oldest cemetery in the village and is located in mohallah Mullah Khel. Barazai contains 25 masjids and one post office.

References

Villages in Attock District